The following is a list of cases that deal with issues of concern to copyright in various jurisdictions. Some of these cases are leading English cases as the law of copyright in various Commonwealth jurisdictions developed out of English law while these countries were colonies of the British Empire. Other cases provide background in areas of copyright law that may be of interest for the legal reasoning or the conclusions they reach.

Australia
Victoria Park Racing & Recreation Grounds Co Ltd v Taylor, idea-expression divide
Cuisenaire v Reed, (a literary work cannot be infringed by a three-dimensional reproduction)
Pacific Film Laboratories v Commissioner of Tax, considered negative rights - the power to prevent the making of a physical thing by copying.

Zeccola v Universal City Studios Inc, there is no copyright in the idea of a theme or a story, but there may be a time where a combination of events and characters reaches sufficient complexity as to give rise to dramatic work copyright
Computer Edge Pty Ltd v Apple Computer Inc, (test in Exxon for literary work is "not intended to establish a comprehensive or exhasutive definition of literary work for copyright purposes" per Mason and Wilson JJ)
CBS Records v Gross, (a cover version of a song can be an original work itself capable of copyright protection)
Greenfield Products Pty Ltd v Rover-Scott Bonnar Ltd, (1990) 17 IPR 417 per Pincus J, the drive mechanism of a law mower was not a sculpture
Yumbulul v Reserve Bank of Australia (Morning Star Pole ten-dollar note case), copyright law does not provide adequate protection of Aboriginal community claims to regulate the reproduction and use of works which are essentially communal in origin 
Autodesk Inc v Dyason (No.2), (1993) 111 ALR 385 (the idea-expression divide is the "dominant principle in copyright law" per Mason CJ: "when the expression of any idea is inseparable from its function, it forms part of the idea and is not entitled to the protection of copyright" per Dawson J)
Sega Enterprises Ltd v Galaxy Electronics Pty Ltd, interactive video games involving computer-generated images are cinematograph films as defined in s 10 of the Copyright Act 1968.

Canada
Muzak Corp. v. CAPAC, [1953], 2 S.C.R. 45 (authorization as infringement)
Canadian Admiral Corp. v. Rediffusion Inc., [1954] Ex. C.R. 382 (performance in public)
Cuisenaire v. South West Imports Ltd., [1968] 1 Ex C.R. 493
Snow v. The Eaton Centre Ltd. (1982), 70 C.P.R. (2d) 105 (Ont. H.C.) (moral rights)
DRG Inc. v. Datafile Ltd. (1987) 18 C.P.R. (3d) 538
Apple Computer Inc. v. Mackintosh Computers Ltd., [1990], 2 S.C.R. 209 (copyright in computer programs)
Prise de Parole Inc. v. Guerin, [1995],F.C.J. No. 1583 (moral rights and damages)
Gould Estate v. Stoddart Publishing Co. Ltd. (1996), 74 C.P.R. (3d) 206 (rights of personality and fixation)
Delrina Corp. v. Triolet Systems Inc. (2002), 58 OR (3d) 339 (merger doctrine and copyright in software)
Théberge v. Galerie d'Art du Petit Champlain Inc., [2002], 2 S.C.R. 336 (Canadian definition of "reproduction")
CCH Canadian Ltd. v. Law Society of Upper Canada 2004, SCC 13 (originality standard, secondary infringement, and fair dealing rights)
Society of Composers, Authors and Music Publishers of Canada v. Canadian Association of Internet Providers, 2004 SCC 45 (ISPs as common carriers and status of caches)
BMG Canada Inc. v. Doe, 2005 FCA 193 (privacy rights of filesharers)
Robertson v. Thomson Corp., 2006 SCC 43 (ownership and licensing of collective works in electronic databases)
Entertainment Software Association v. Society of Composers, Authors and Music Publishers of Canada, 2012 SCC 34 (holding that downloads engaged only reproduction rights and not communication rights)
 Rogers Communications Inc. v. Society of Composers, Authors and Music Publishers of Canada, 2012 SCC 35 (clarifying the meaning of "communication to the public" in the context of online streaming music)
Society of Composers, Authors and Music Publishers of Canada v. Bell Canada, 2012 SCC 36 (clarifying fair dealing in the context of streamed music)
Alberta (Education) v. Canadian Copyright Licensing Agency (Access Copyright), 2012 SCC 37 (applying the fair dealing to photocopied textbooks in public schools)
Re:Sound v. Motion Picture Theatre Associations of Canada, 2012 SCC 38 (clarifying the definition of "sound recording" in the context of soundtracks of cinematographic works)
 (copyright resides in proposals, treatments and formats, and infringement can occur when subsequent audiovisual works use their elements without ever actually literally copying them)

France
Societe Le Chant du Monde v. Societe Fox Europe and Societe Fox Americaine Twentieth Century Cour d'appel, Paris, Jan. 13, 1953, D.A. 1954, 16, 80, held in favor of the plaintiffs due to the very strong moral rights regime in France.

India
 Pine Labs Pvt Ltd vs Gemalto Terminals India Pvt Limited - in FAO(OS) 635 of 2009 decided by DB Delhi High Court on 3.8.2011 (https://web.archive.org/web/20120201004419/http://lobis.nic.in/dhc/AKS/judgement/01-10-2011/AKS03082011FAOOS6352009.pdf Pine Labs Pvt Ltd vs Gemalto Terminals India Ltd and others): In the absence of the period of assignment or territory of assignment being specified, the assignment  is deemed to be for 5 years and territory is deemed to be the territory of India as per section 19(5) and 19(6) of Copyright Act. After the period of 5 years, copyright reverts to assignor.
 THE CHANCELLOR, MASTERS & SCHOLARS OF UNIVERSITY OF OXFORD & ORS Versus RAMESHWARI PHOTOCOPY SERVICES & ORS last judgement on December 9, 2016 was by Delhi Highcourt.

Japan
"Winny copyright infringement case" (2011) Supreme Court Hei 21(A) 1900

New ZealandGreen v. Broadcasting Corp of NZ (1989) APIC 90-590: Privy Council definition of "dramatic works": " a dramatic work must have sufficient unity to be capable of performance"

United Kingdom
Bach v. Longman
Gyles v Wilcox (1740) 3 Atk. 143; 26 Eng. Rep. 489 (a fair abridgement of a work is not copyright infringement)
Entick v Carrington (1765) 95 ER 807 (authorities have no power which is not explicitly given to them by law; repercussions far beyond exclusive rights)
Millar v. Taylor (1769) 4 Burr 2303; 98 ER 201 (copyright is perpetual)
Donaldson v. Beckett (1774) 4 Burr 2408; 98 ER 257 (copyright is not perpetual)
Dick v. Yates (1881) 18 Ch D 76 (a title is not long enough to constitute a literary work)
Kenrick v. Lawrence (1890) L.R. QBD 99
Hollingrake v. Truswell [1894] Ch. 420
Walter v. Lane [1900] AC 539 ("reporter's copyright")
Corelli v. Grey (1913) 29 TLR 570 (four reasons for clear objective similarity between works)
University of London Press Ltd. v. University Tutorial Press Ltd. [1916] 2 Ch. 601
Re Dickens (1934) 1 Ch 267
Hawkes & Son (London) Ltd v. Paramount Film Service Ltd [1934] 1 Ch 593 (the Colonel Bogey case - infringement of copyright occurs when "a substantial, a vital and an essential part" of a work is copied, per Lord Slesser)
Jennings v. Stephens [1936] Ch. 469 ("performance in public" as infringement)
Donahue v. Allied Newspapers Ltd (1938) Ch 106 ["idea-expression divide"]
Ladbroke (Football) Ltd v. William Hill (Football) Ltd [1964]1 WLR 273
LB (Plastics) Ltd. v. Swish Products Ltd. [1979] RPC 551 (the basis of copyright protection is that "one man must not be able to appropriate the result of another's labour")
Exxon Corp v. Exxon Insurance Consultants International (1981) 3 All ER 241 [Exxon name has no copyright]
Express Newspapers v. News (UK) Ltd (1990) 18 IPR 201 (confirming Walter v. Lane)
Lucasfilm Ltd v Ainsworth [2011] UKSC 39 (on whether a film prop can be a sculpture)
Temple Island Collections Ltd v New English Teas Ltd [2012] EWPCC 1 (revising the originality standard)

United States

Note: if no court name is given, according to convention, the case is from the Supreme Court of the United States.  Supreme Court rulings are binding precedent across the United States; Circuit Court rulings are binding within a certain portion of it (the circuit in question); District Court rulings are not binding precedent, but may still be referred to by other courts.

See also
List of trademark case law
List of patent case law

References

Case law
Copyright